Marraccini is an Italian surname. Notable people with the surname include:

Dirty Martini (burlesque) (born Linda Marraccini), American burlesque dancer, pin-up model, and dance teacher
Matt Marraccini (born 1981), American actor

Italian-language surnames